Werewolves Within is a multiplayer social-deduction VR game for Oculus Rift, Windows, and PlayStation VR, developed by Red Storm Entertainment, published by Ubisoft, and released on 6 December 2016.

Gameplay
The game is set in a medieval-fantasy town that is being attacked by a werewolf, and players are tasked to guess which of the townsfolk is the werewolf in disguise in a Mafia-style format.

Reception

The Official UK PlayStation Magazine listed it as the ninth best PS VR game.

Film adaptation

In October 2018, it was announced Werewolves Within was being developed as a feature film, with Mishna Wolff set to write the screenplay for the film, while Ubisoft Motion Pictures would produce. In January 2020, it was announced Sam Richardson had joined the cast of the film and would serve as a producer, with Josh Ruben to direct. In February 2020, Michael Chernus, Michaela Watkins, Cheyenne Jackson, Milana Vayntrub, George Basil, Sarah Burns, Catherine Curtin, Wayne Duvall, Harvey Guillén and Rebecca Henderson joined the cast of the film. 

Principal photography began in February 2020.

References

External links

2016 video games
HTC Vive games
Multiplayer video games
Oculus Rift games
PlayStation 4 games
PlayStation VR games
Social deduction video games
Ubisoft games
Video games developed in the United States
Video games with cross-platform play
Virtual reality games
Werewolf games
Windows games
Red Storm Entertainment games
Video games adapted into films